Piety Street is a 2009 studio album by jazz guitarist John Scofield. It was recorded in New Orleans with Meters bassist George Porter Jr. and keyboardist/vocalist Jon Cleary. The album features gospel music with Cleary singing most of the songs. John Boutte is the guest vocalist on three tracks.

Track listing 
 "That's Enough"
 "Motherless Child"
 "It's a Big Army"
 "His Eye is on the Sparrow"
 "Something's Got a Hold on Me"
 "The Old Ship of Zion"
 "Ninety Nine and a Half"
 "Just a Little While to Stay Here"
 "Never Turn Back"
 "Walk With Me"
 "But I Like the Message"
 "The Angel of Death"
 "I'll Fly Away"

Personnel 
 John Scofield – guitar
 Jon Cleary – organ, piano, vocals
 George Porter Jr. – bass guitar
 Ricky Fataar – drums
 Shannon Powell – drums, percussion
 John Boutté – vocals

References

2009 albums
Post-bop albums
John Scofield albums